Philipp von Hessen may refer to:

Philip I, Landgrave of Hesse (1504-1567)
Philipp, Landgrave of Hesse (1896-1980)
Philip III, Landgrave of Hesse-Butzbach (1581-1643)
Philip of Hesse-Darmstadt (1671-1736)
Philip, Landgrave of Hesse-Philippsthal (1655-1721)
Philip II, Landgrave of Hesse-Rheinfels (1541-1583)